Maine's 5th congressional district was a congressional district in Maine. It was created in 1821 after Maine achieved statehood in 1820.  It was eliminated in 1883.  Its last congressman was Thompson Henry Murch.

List of members representing the district

References

 Congressional Biographical Directory of the United States 1774–present

05
Former congressional districts of the United States
Constituencies established in 1821
Constituencies disestablished in 1883
1821 establishments in Maine
1883 disestablishments in Maine